Cambridge High School is a public charter high school in Milton, Georgia and a school of the Fulton County School System.

The 17th high school to open in the district and relieving Alpharetta High School and Milton High School, it opened in August 2012.

History
Cambridge High School first opened its doors for the 2012–13 school year. It opened to relieve overcrowding at Alpharetta High School and Milton High School. The letter C in the school's name is named for the Cogburn family, who previously owned the property the school sits on, the A and M are in honor of the students who moved over from Alpharetta and Milton High Schools, while the bridge part is named for a bridge on the school property. It was designed by CGLS Architects.

Notable alumni 

 John Hurst ('15) – College Football player for the West Georgia Wolves (2016–2020), current free agent

References

External links
 Cambridge High School
 

Fulton County School System high schools
2012 establishments in Georgia (U.S. state)
Educational institutions established in 2012